Raritan is a borough in Somerset County, New Jersey, United States. As of the 2010 United States Census, the borough's population was 6,881, reflecting an increase of 543 (+8.6%) from the 6,338 counted in the 2000 Census, which had in turn increased by 540 (+9.3%) from the 5,798 counted in the 1990 Census.

The borough's name is derived from the Raritans, a Native American group of Lenapes. The name of the tribe is said to mean "forked river", "stream overflows" or "point on a tidal river".

History
Raritan town was originally established as a subdivision within Bridgewater Township by act of the New Jersey Legislature on April 3, 1868. After a series of bitter lawsuits between Raritan and Bridgewater in the 1930s and 1940s, the Legislature allowed Raritan to become a fully independent Borough by an Act on May 12, 1948, based on the results of a referendum passed on June 12, 1948. The new borough incorporated the old town and an additional portion of Bridgewater Township.

The Knox–Porter Resolution ending United States involvement in World War I was signed by President Harding at the estate of New Jersey Senator Joseph S. Frelinghuysen Sr. on July 2, 1921.

Geography
According to the United States Census Bureau, the borough had a total area of 2.03 square miles (5.27 km2), including 1.99 square miles (5.16 km2) of land and 0.04 square miles (0.11 km2) of water (2.02%).

The borough borders the Somerset County municipalities of Bridgewater Township, Hillsborough Township and Somerville.

Raritan is in the western division of the Raritan Valley (a line of cities in central New Jersey), along with Branchburg and Bridgewater.

Demographics

Census 2010

The Census Bureau's 2006–2010 American Community Survey showed that (in 2010 inflation-adjusted dollars) median household income was $70,116 (with a margin of error of +/− $10,294) and the median family income was $79,813 (+/− $8,715). Males had a median income of $54,130 (+/− $7,617) versus $44,125 (+/− $12,260) for females. The per capita income for the borough was $34,617 (+/− $5,703). About 6.3% of families and 7.4% of the population were below the poverty line, including 15.4% of those under age 18 and 3.5% of those age 65 or over.

Census 2000

As of the 2000 United States Census there were 6,338 people, 2,556 households, and 1,671 families residing in the borough. The population density was 3,113.8 people per square mile (1,199.6/km2). There were 2,644 housing units at an average density of 1,299.0 per square mile (500.4/km2). The racial makeup of the borough was 87.74% White, 0.93% African American, 0.08% Native American, 8.17% Asian, 0.16% Pacific Islander, 1.64% from other races, and 1.28% from two or more races. Hispanic or Latino of any race were 8.41% of the population.

There were 2,556 households, out of which 30.1% had children under the age of 18 living with them, 51.0% were married couples living together, 10.0% had a female householder with no husband present, and 34.6% were non-families. 29.0% of all households were made up of individuals, and 11.9% had someone living alone who was 65 years of age or older. The average household size was 2.48 and the average family size was 3.08.

In the borough, the population was spread out, with 22.3% under the age of 18, 6.5% from 18 to 24, 35.0% from 25 to 44, 20.0% from 45 to 64, and 16.2% who were 65 years of age or older. The median age was 38 years. For every 100 females, there were 92.3 males. For every 100 females age 18 and over, there were 91.1 males.

The median income for a household in the borough was $51,122, and the median income for a family was $59,962. Males had a median income of $46,071 versus $35,704 for females. The per capita income for the borough was $26,420. About 5.5% of families and 6.4% of the population were below the poverty line, including 6.0% of those under age 18 and 12.8% of those age 65 or over.

Parks and recreation
Frelinghuysen Park is a public park dedicated to General John Frederick Frelinghuysen. This is the only public park in Raritan, except for Basilone Park and Elizabeth Ave Park, and it includes two little league baseball fields, two full-sized outdoor basketball courts, two full sized tennis courts and a playground. During the summer months Frelinghuysen Park and Basilone Park have recreational pools open to children. The parks offers tables for picnicking. It is located at the end of Sherman Avenue before getting onto Highway 206.

Government

Local government
Raritan is governed under the Borough form of New Jersey municipal government, which is used in 218 municipalities (of the 564) statewide, making it the most common form of government in New Jersey. The governing body is comprised of the Mayor and the Borough Council, with all positions elected at-large on a partisan basis as part of the November general election. The Mayor is elected directly by the voters to a four-year term of office. The Borough Council is comprised of six members elected to serve three-year terms on a staggered basis, with two seats coming up for election each year in a three-year cycle. The Borough form of government used by Raritan is a "weak mayor / strong council" government in which council members act as the legislative body with the mayor presiding at meetings and voting only in the event of a tie. The mayor can veto ordinances subject to an override by a two-thirds majority vote of the council. The mayor makes committee and liaison assignments for council members, and most appointments are made by the mayor with the advice and consent of the council.

, the Mayor of the Borough of Raritan is Republican Zachary Bray, whose term of office expires December 31, 2023. Members of the Raritan Borough Council are Council President Nicolas J. Carra (R, 2022), David Fritzinger (R, 2024), Paul Giraldi (R, 2022), Joan Hutzler (R, 2023; elected to serve an unexpired term), Joyce Melitsky (R, 2024) and Pablo Orozco (D, 2023).

In May 2021, the borough council selected Democrat Justice Ifan to fill the seat expiring in December 2023 that became vacant following the resignation of Melissa Harris the previous month. In the November 2021 general election, Republican Joan Hutzler was elected to serve the balance of the term of office.

In January 2020, the Borough Council appointed Republican Michael Patente to fill the seat expiring in December 2021 that became vacant when Zachary Bray took office as mayor earlier that month; Patente served on an interim basis until the November 2020 general election, when he was chosen by voters to serve the balance of the term of office.

Rocco Miele was Raritan's first mayor, serving from its founding in 1948 to 1953.

Federal, state and county representation
Raritan is located in the 7th Congressional District and is part of New Jersey's 23rd state legislative district.

 

Somerset County is governed by a five-member Board of County Commissioners, whose members are elected at-large to three-year terms of office on a staggered basis, with one or two seats coming up for election each year. At an annual reorganization meeting held on the first Friday of January, the board selects a Director and Deputy Director from among its members. , Somerset County's County Commissioners are
Director Shanel Robinson (D, Franklin Township, term as commissioner ends December 31, 2024; term as director ends 2022),
Deputy Director Melonie Marano (D, Green Brook Township, term as commissioner and as deputy director ends 2022),
Paul Drake (D, Hillsborough Township, 2023),
Douglas Singleterry (D, North Plainfield, 2023) and 
Sara Sooy (D, Basking Ridge in Bernards Township, 2024).
Pursuant to Article VII Section II of the New Jersey State Constitution, each county in New Jersey is required to have three elected administrative officials known as constitutional officers. These officers are the County Clerk and County Surrogate (both elected for five-year terms of office) and the County Sheriff (elected for a three-year term). Constitutional officers, elected on a countywide basis are 
County Clerk Steve Peter (D, Somerville, 2022),
Sheriff Darrin Russo (D, Franklin Township, 2022) and 
Surrogate Bernice "Tina" Jalloh (D, Franklin Township, 2025)

Politics

As of March 23, 2011, there were a total of 3,926 registered voters in Raritan, of which 1,122 (28.6% vs. 26.0% countywide) were registered as Democrats, 882 (22.5% vs. 25.7%) were registered as Republicans and 1,917 (48.8% vs. 48.2%) were registered as Unaffiliated. There were 5 voters registered as Libertarians or Greens. Among the borough's 2010 Census population, 57.1% (vs. 60.4% in Somerset County) were registered to vote, including 74.2% of those ages 18 and over (vs. 80.4% countywide).

In the 2012 presidential election, Republican Mitt Romney received 50.0% of the vote (1,360 cast), ahead of Democrat Barack Obama with 48.7% (1,323 votes), and other candidates with 1.3% (35 votes), among the 2,759 ballots cast by the borough's 4,159 registered voters (41 ballots were spoiled), for a turnout of 66.3%. In the 2008 presidential election, Republican John McCain received 1,514 votes (52.6% vs. 46.1% countywide), ahead of Democrat Barack Obama with 1,287 votes (44.7% vs. 52.1%) and other candidates with 42 votes (1.5% vs. 1.1%), among the 2,879 ballots cast by the borough's 3,830 registered voters, for a turnout of 75.2% (vs. 78.7% in Somerset County). In the 2004 presidential election, Republican George W. Bush received 1,497 votes (53.4% vs. 51.5% countywide), ahead of Democrat John Kerry with 1,239 votes (44.2% vs. 47.2%) and other candidates with 33 votes (1.2% vs. 0.9%), among the 2,802 ballots cast by the borough's 3,606 registered voters, for a turnout of 77.7% (vs. 81.7% in the whole county).

In the 2013 gubernatorial election, Republican Chris Christie received 72.0% of the vote (1,249 cast), ahead of Democrat Barbara Buono with 26.0% (451 votes), and other candidates with 2.0% (34 votes), among the 1,759 ballots cast by the borough's 4,253 registered voters (25 ballots were spoiled), for a turnout of 41.4%. In the 2009 gubernatorial election, Republican Chris Christie received 1,292 votes (60.9% vs. 55.8% countywide), ahead of Democrat Jon Corzine with 562 votes (26.5% vs. 34.1%), Independent Chris Daggett with 202 votes (9.5% vs. 8.7%) and other candidates with 22 votes (1.0% vs. 0.7%), among the 2,120 ballots cast by the borough's 3,948 registered voters, yielding a 53.7% turnout (vs. 52.5% in the county).

Education

Students from Raritan attend the Bridgewater-Raritan Regional School District, together with students from Bridgewater Township. As of the 2017–2018 school year, the district, comprised of 11 schools, had an enrollment of 8,603 students and 782.8 classroom teachers (on an FTE basis), for a student–teacher ratio of 11.0:1. Schools in the district (with 2017–2018 enrollment data from the National Center for Education Statistics) are 
Adamsville Primary School (569 students; in grades Pre-K–4), 
Bradley Gardens Primary School (294; Pre-K–4), 
Crim Primary School (383; Pre-K–4), 
Hamilton Primary School (507; K–4), 
John F. Kennedy Primary School (397; K–4), 
Milltown Primary School (427; Pre-K–4), 
Van Holten Primary School (416; K–4), 
Eisenhower Intermediate School (770; 5–6), 
Hillside Intermediate School (574; 5–6), 
Bridgewater–Raritan Middle School (1,411; 7–8) and 
Bridgewater–Raritan High School (2,882; 9–12). The overwhelming majority of students in the district are from Bridgewater, with approximately 1,000 students from Raritan. All schools in the district are in Bridgewater except for Kennedy, which is in Raritan.

During the 1999–2000 school year, Bridgewater-Raritan High School was recognized with the National Blue Ribbon School Award of Excellence by the United States Department of Education, the highest award an American school can receive from the federal government.

Public high school students also have the option to attend the Somerset County Vocational and Technical High School, a four-year magnet school located in Bridgewater that provides occupational and academic training to students from all of Somerset County.

St. Ann Classical Academy is a classical, liberal-arts Catholic school for students in pre-kindergarten through eighth grade that operates under the supervision of the Raritan Oratory of St. Philip Neri and the Roman Catholic Diocese of Metuchen.

Transportation

Roads and highways

U.S. Route 202 traverses the borough from east to west. U.S. Route 206 follows the border with Somerville. New Jersey Route 28 has one side of the roadway within the borough as it follows the border with Bridgewater Township. The northern terminus of County Route 567 is in Raritan.

U.S. Routes 202 and 206 intersect with NJ Route 28 at the Somerville Circle on the borders with Bridgewater Township and Somerville, with the eastern half of the circle located in Raritan. As part of an ongoing effort to improve traffic safety at the circle, the New Jersey Department of Transportation has made a series of changes to the structure of the traffic circle, originally constructed during the 1930s. With the suburbanization of the area, the circle was handling an average of 70,000 vehicles each day. In 1994, an overpass was completed to allow traffic on Route 202 between Flemington and Interstate 78 and Interstate 287 to avoid the circle, though the rate of accidents grew from 195 in 1991 before the project started to 302 for the year after the overpass was open to traffic. After yield signs were added in February 1995, the accident rate increased again, to an annualized rate above 400 per year.

Public transportation
The Raritan train station offers NJ Transit service on the Raritan Valley Line to Newark Penn Station. The station is north of the town center on Thompson Street. The station building is south of the tracks in the main parking lot and was built in the early 1890s. There are also three other small lots for this station. Raritan is usually the most frequent terminus of the Raritan Valley Line. There is limited service farther west to High Bridge.

The borough is served by the CAT-1R, 2R, and 3R routes (which all continue to Raritan Valley Community College on the western end. On the eastern end, buses continue to New Brunswick, North Plainfield, and Bridgewater Commons respectively), operated by Community Access Transit.

Community

The Raritan Public Library is located in what was originally the homestead of General John Frederick Frelinghuysen.

Notable people

People who were born in, residents of, or otherwise closely associated with Raritan include:

 John Basilone (1916–1945), awarded the Medal of Honor for his actions at the Battle of Guadalcanal
 Tony Bongiovi (born 1947), record producer and recording engineer
 Isaac Brokaw (1746–1826), clockmaker
 Ben Carnevale (1915–2008), basketball coach inducted into the Basketball Hall of Fame in 1970
 Jack Ciattarelli (born 1961), member of the New Jersey General Assembly who represented the 16th Legislative District from 2011 to 2018
 Joseph S. Frelinghuysen Sr. (1869–1948), U.S. Senator representing New Jersey
 Mike Grosso (born 1947), former professional basketball player who played in the American Basketball Association
 Terry Matalas (born 1975), screenwriter, grew up near Raritan
 Frank Perantoni (1923–1991), American football center who played professional football for the New York Yankees
 Elvira Woodruff (born 1951), children's writer known for books that include elements of fantasy and history

References

External links

 Raritan Borough official web site

 
1948 establishments in New Jersey
Borough form of New Jersey government
Boroughs in Somerset County, New Jersey
Populated places established in 1948